Lake Milton is a census-designated place in central Milton Township, Mahoning County, Ohio, United States.  The population was 637 at the 2020 census. Located in northwestern Mahoning County, it sits along the shore of the Lake Milton reservoir, along with the village of Craig Beach. It is part of the Youngstown–Warren metropolitan area.

History
In 1910, the nearby city of Youngstown acquired  along the Mahoning River in Milton Township with the intent to construct a reservoir that would be used as a valuable water supply to cool the city's iron and steel mills. Construction of this reservoir had not yet started by 1913 when the largest flood to date struck the area. No fatalities were experienced but the Mahoning Valley’s flooded plains and tributaries caused significant commercial and industrial damage. This increased awareness and need for flood control jump started the construction of the Lake Milton dam later that year. Completed in 1917, the newly constructed  dam created  of what is now known as Lake Milton.

By 1982, it was the only lake in Ohio where muskellunge (muskie) spawned and was the location of the largest muskie caught in North America. In 1984, the then 67-year-old dam needed an estimated $5 million in repairs which the city of Youngstown, the lake's owner, refused to pay. Roughly 1,000 homeowners, cottage leasers, and businesspeople banded together to successfully ask the Ohio General Assembly to provide the money for the repairs. The City of Youngstown, admitting that they could no longer maintain the dam, asked the state to take over the lake as a state park and in the fall of 1988, the Ohio Department of Natural Resources approved to do so.

A post office called Lake Milton has been in operation since 1942, with the ZIP code 44429. The community takes its name from nearby Lake Milton, a reservoir impounded by a dam constructed in 1913, following that year's flood of the Mahoning River.

Demographics

Reservoir
There is a small uninhabited island on the southeast portion of the lake that is a common spot for anchoring and swimming. No wake zones are established along the perimeter of the lake, in the zone between the two bridges, and in the narrow southern end of the lake, commonly referred to as "the river". The dam is at the north end of the lake. The southern end ultimately connects to Berlin Lake although it is not possible to take a power watercraft through this route.

Recreation

In 1988, Lake Milton was officially dedicated as Ohio's 72nd state park, as water levels of the lake returned after the dam's repair. The State Park's management afforded the construction of water and sewer lines in 1990, enabling real estate in the area to become more valuable, particularly in the northeast part of the lake. These lines attracted a local auto dealer, Wally Armour, to build a  home on Countyline Road in 2001 with a cost of more than $1 million. The home later sold in 2017 for $1.8 million. It was hardly just the beginning of a new wave of residential development, though. From 2005 – 2007 an additional investment of $20 million for water and sewer projects, expanded such amenities to a much larger portion of the lake and eliminated lake contaminants along with it. Longtime Milton Township zoning inspector Michael Kurilla Jr. cited that lakefront lots once worth $150,000 - $175,000 in 2013 were selling for $525,000 by 2020. Jeff Uroseva, chief building official for Mahoning County shared that residential construction in Milton Township has risen from 5 permits in 2016 to 15 permits in 2020.

Lake Milton State Park is one of the largest lakes in Ohio with unlimited horsepower boating, swimming, and fishing. Activities available in the  park include:
 Archery
 Boating
 Disc Golf
 Fishing
 Hunting
 Reservable Day-use Shelters
 Swimming
 Trails
 Winter Recreation (snowmobiling, skiing, and ice fishing)
 Basketball
 Sand Volleyball
 Playground

Common wildlife to be found around Lake Milton include Cottontail rabbit, Red fox, Raccoon, Muskrat, Woodchuck, Robins, Warblers,  Pine siskins, Hawks, Owls, Midland painted turtle, and Northern watersnake.

The park is open from 6am to 11pm daily under the supervision of the park's manager.

Education
Children in Lake Milton are served by the Jackson-Milton Local School District. The current schools serving the community are:
Jackson-Milton Elementary School – grades K-5
Jackson-Milton Middle School – grades 6-8
Jackson-Milton High School – grades 9-12

Bridges
Lake Milton has three bridges. The northern most and largest is known for the fact that it carries IR 76 over the lake, many people refer to it as such but its name is the Peter J. Delucia Memorial Bridge. It is so named as Peter Delucia was working on the bridge during its reconstruction in 2003 when he was electrocuted. The second longest bridge is the Mahoning Ave bridge. It was originally built in 1915 and reconstructed in 1991. Less busy than the Delucia Bridge, it is a popular spot for fisherman and fitness enthusiasts alike. The third bridge is Ellsworth Road going over the very southern end of the lake.

References

Census-designated places in Mahoning County, Ohio
1913 establishments in Ohio